"Learning to Fly" is a song by American rock band Tom Petty and the Heartbreakers. It was written in 1991 by Tom Petty and his writing partner Jeff Lynne for the band's eighth studio album, Into the Great Wide Open (1991). The entire song is based on four simple chords, (F, C, A minor, and G). It became a top hit for Petty and the Heartbreakers, topping the US Album Rock Tracks chart and peaking at number 28 on the Billboard Hot 100.

Release
"Learning to Fly" was released as the first single from Into the Great Wide Open and reached number 28 on the US Billboard Hot 100 chart. It also became his most successful single on the Billboard Album Rock Tracks chart, reaching the top of the chart and remaining at the summit for six weeks. The song was released in the United Kingdom on June 17, 1991, debuting at number 65 on the UK Singles Chart six days later. It rose to its peak of number 46 the following week and stayed on the UK chart for two more weeks before leaving the top 75.

The song was played and was a headline for an NBA home video documentary of the 1990–91 Chicago Bulls season.

Track listing
7-inch vinyl
A. "Learning to Fly"
B. "Too Good to Be True"

Personnel
Tom Petty and the Heartbreakers
 Tom Petty – lead vocals and backing vocals, acoustic guitar
 Mike Campbell – double neck electric guitar and backing vocals
 Howie Epstein – bass and backing vocals
 Stan Lynch – drums and percussion
 Benmont Tench – synthesizer

Others
 Jeff Lynne – backing vocals

Charts

Weekly charts

Year-end charts

Certifications

Release history

Cover version
Petty's Traveling Wilburys bandmate Bob Dylan covered the song live in concert in Broomfield, Colorado on October 21, 2017, one day after what would have been Petty's 67th birthday. Critic Jack Whatley later cited the performance as one of the seven best covers of a Petty song.

References

Tom Petty songs
1991 singles
1991 songs
Black-and-white music videos
Jangle pop songs
MCA Records singles
Music videos directed by Julien Temple
Song recordings produced by Jeff Lynne
Songs written by Jeff Lynne
Songs written by Tom Petty